Tappeh Goleh-ye Sofla (also Romanized as Tappeh Goleh-ye Soflá and Tappeh Galleh-ye Soflá; also known as Tappeh Goleh) is a village in Howmeh-ye Shomali Rural District, in the Central District of Eslamabad-e Gharb County, Kermanshah Province, Iran. At the 2006 census, its population was 181, in 46 families.

References 

Populated places in Eslamabad-e Gharb County